Charalampos "Babis" Damianakis (born 14 June 1995) is a Greek professional football player who plays as a centre back for Almyros Gaziou.

Career
Damianakis began his career with the youth team of OFI Crete. On 1 July 2013 he was promoted to the first squad and signed a professional contract. He played for the Cretan club for almost 3 years and made 13 official appearances in the Greek Super League and in the Gamma Ethniki. On 29 January 2016 he signed a 3,5 years contract with AEL. On 28 August 2016 Damianakis was given on loan to Cretan Football League club AO Chania until the end of the season. For the 2017-18 season, he signed with Football League club Veria. 

On 30 December 2019, Damianakis joined Almyros Gaziou.

References

External links
FL News.gr
larissanet.gr
superleaguegreece.net

1995 births
Living people
Greece youth international footballers
Athlitiki Enosi Larissa F.C. players
OFI Crete F.C. players
AO Chania F.C. players
Veria F.C. players
Irodotos FC players
Footballers from Heraklion
Greek footballers
Association football central defenders